This list contains names of people who were found guilty of capital crimes and placed on death row but later found to be wrongly convicted. Many of these exonerees' sentences were overturned by acquittal or pardon, but some of those listed were exonerated posthumously. The state listed is that in which the conviction occurred, the year is that of release and the case is that which overturned the conviction.

This list does not include:
 Posthumous pardons for individuals executed before 1950.
 Inmates who were given life sentences when their country, province or state abolished the death penalty.
 People who were threatened with death and never jailed.
 People who were jailed by extralegal groups or courts, for example, as often occurs in cases of sentences of stoning.

List by country

Japan

1983
 Sakae Menda was forced to confess to the murders of a Buddhist priest and his wife in 1948 and was convicted on two counts of murder and robbery in 1949. In a 1983 retrial, he was found not guilty of all charges. He died in 2020.
1989
 Masao Akahori was convicted in 1954 at the age of 24 of raping and murdering a schoolgirl. In 1989, he became the fourth death row inmate in Japan to be released.

Taiwan
2012
 Su Chien-ho (蘇建和), Liu Bing-lang (劉秉郎) and Chuang Lin-hsun (莊林勳) were sentenced to death for the 1991 murder of Wu Ming-han and his wife Yeh Ying-lan in Xizhi District, Taipei County, Taiwan. They were acquitted in 2012.
2016
 Cheng Hsing-tse (鄭性澤) was sentenced to death for the 2002 murder of a police officer in Fengyuan, Taichung, Taiwan. He was acquitted in May 2016.

United Kingdom

1966
 Timothy Evans, convicted of the murder of his infant daughter Geraldine in 1950, was hanged on March 9, 1950, and posthumously pardoned in 1966.

1968
 Mahmood Hussein Mattan, convicted and hanged 1952, conviction quashed 1998.
 Derek Bentley, convicted 1952, executed 1953, pardoned 1993, conviction quashed 1998.

1969
 Death penalty for murder abolished.

1973
 Despite abolition in the rest of the UK, separate legal systems meant that death sentences stood in Northern Ireland (and the Isle of Man and Channel Islands, which are outside the UK) but with no likelihood of execution. A Provisional Irish Republican Army member was sentenced to death for murder before abolition was extended across the UK. European Union human-rights protocols signed in 1999 abolished the death penalty in EU nations, but the UK is no longer an EU member.

United States

As of October 2, 2021, the Innocence Database maintained by the Death Penalty Information Center shows 186 exonerations of prisoners on death row in the United States since 1973.

1820s

1820

 Jesse Boorn, Vermont. Convicted 1819.
 Stephen Boorn, Vermont. Convicted 1819.

1850s

1851

 Thomas Berdue, California. Convicted 1851.

1880s

1889

 William Woods, Arkansas. Convicted 1888.

1890s

1895

 Michael Sabol, Pennsylvania. Convicted 1891.

1897

 George Rusnak, Pennsylvania. Convicted 1891.
 William Jackson Marion, Nebraska. Convicted 1887.

1898

 Will Purvis, Mississippi. Convicted 1893.

1900s

1901

 Michael J. Synon, Illinois. Convicted 1900.

1902

 Henry Miller, Arkansas. Convicted 1888.

1905

 Samuel Greason, Pennsylvania. Convicted 1901.

1910s

1911

 David Sherman, Tennessee. Convicted 1907.
 Andrew Toth, Pennsylvania. Convicted 1891.
 Stearns Kendall Abbott, Massachusetts. Convicted 1880.

1913

 J.B. Brown, Florida. Convicted 1901.

1915

 John McElwrath, Tennessee. Convicted 1903.

1917

 Herman Zajicek, Illinois. Convicted 1907.

1918

 Charles Stielow, New York. Convicted 1915.

1920s

1920

 Frank Jordano, Louisiana. Convicted 1919.
 John Pender, Oregon. Convicted 1913.

1928

 George Williams, North Carolina. Convicted 1922.
 Fred Dove, North Carolina. Convicted 1922.
 Frank Dove, North Carolina. Convicted 1922.

1929

 Joseph Weaver, Ohio. Convicted 1927.

1930s

1930

 Gangi Cero, Massachusetts. Convicted 1927.
 Richard Phillips, Virginia. Convicted 1900.

1931

 William Harper, Virginia. Convicted 1931.

1933

 Harry Cashin, New York. Convicted 1931.
 Edward Larkman, New York. Convicted 1926.

1936

 Gus Langley, North Carolina. Convicted 1932.

1937

 Eugene Williams, Alabama. Convicted 1931.
 Willie Roberson, Alabama. Convicted 1931.
 Ozie Powell, Alabama. Convicted 1931.
 Olen Montgomery, Alabama. Convicted 1931.

1938

 Ayliff Draper, Arkansas. Convicted 1935.
 Tom Jones, Kentucky. Convicted 1935.

1939

 Thomas J. Mooney, California. Convicted 1917.

1940s

1940

 George Bilger, Pennsylvania. Convicted 1938.

1942

 Walter Woodward, Florida. Convicted 1933.
 Jack Williamson, Florida. Convicted 1933.
 Charlie Davis, Florida. Convicted 1933.

1943

 William Wellmon, North Carolina. Convicted 1942.

1945

 Charles Bernstein, DC. Convicted 1933.

1946

 Sidney Rudish, New York. Convicted 1943.
 Morris Malinski, New York. Convicted 1943. 

1948

 Lemuel Parrott, North Carolina. Convicted 1947.

1949

 Clyde Beale, West Virginia. Convicted 1926.

1950s

1951

 Horace Wilson, New Jersey. Convicted 1948.
 James Thorpe, New Jersey. Convicted 1948.
 John McKenzie, New Jersey. Convicted 1948.
 McKinley Forrest, New Jersey. Convicted 1948.

1952

 Silas Rogers, Virginia. Convicted 1943.

1953

 George Lettrich, Illinois. Convicted 1951.

1956

 Camilo Leyra, New York. Convicted 1950.

1957

 L.D. Harris, South Carolina. Convicted 1947.
 Aaron Turner, Pennsylvania. Convicted 1946.

1958

 Harry Dale Bundy, Ohio. Convicted 1957.
 James Fulton Foster, Georgia. Convicted 1956.

1960s

1962

 Robert Lee Kidd, California. Convicted 1960.
 Isidore Zimmerman, New York. Convicted 1938.

1965

 Theodore Jordan, Oregon. Convicted 1932.

1966

 Robert Ballard Bailey, West Virginia. Convicted 1950.

1967

 James Giles, Maryland. Convicted 1961.
 John Giles, Maryland. Convicted 1961.

1968

 Joseph Johnson, Maryland. Convicted 1962.

1969

 Paul Kern Imbler, California. Convicted 1961.

1970s
1971

 Lloyd Eldon Miller, Illinois. Convicted 1956.

1973

 Dave Roby Keaton, Florida. Convicted 1971.

1974

 Anthony Carey, North Carolina. Convicted 1973.

1975

 Freddie Pitts and Wilbur Lee, Florida. Convicted 1963 
 Clarence Smith, Jr., New Mexico. Convicted 1974.
 Ronald Keine, New Mexico. Convicted 1974.
 Richard Greer, New Mexico. Convicted 1974.
 Thomas Gladish, New Mexico. Convicted 1974.
 Christopher Spicer, North Carolina. Convicted 1973.
 James Creamer, Georgia. Convicted 1973.

1976

 Clarence Norris, Alabama. Convicted 1931.

1977

 Delbert Tibbs, Florida. Convicted in 1974.

1978

 Earl Patrick Charles, Georgia. Convicted 1975.
 Gary Radi, Montana. Convicted 1975.

1979

 Gary Beeman, Ohio. Convicted 1976.

1980s 
1980

 Jerry Banks, Georgia. Convicted 1975.
 Larry Hicks, Indiana. Convicted 1978.

1981

 Michael Linder, South Carolina. Convicted 1979.
 Johnny Ross, Louisiana. Convicted 1975.

1982

 Lawyer Johnson, Massachusetts. Convicted 1972.

1986

 Anthony Silah Brown, Florida. Convicted 1983.
 Neil Ferber, Pennsylvania. Convicted 1981.
 Clifford Henry Bowen, Oklahoma. Convicted 1981.

1987

 Joseph Green Brown. Florida. Convicted 1974. He was re-arrested in 2012 and charged with the murder of his wife in North Carolina, for which he was convicted on September 12, 2013.
 Perry Cobb and Darby J. Tillis. Illinois. Convicted 1979. The primary witness in the case, Phyllis Santini, was determined to be an accomplice of the actual killer by the Illinois Supreme Court. The Judge in the case, Thomas J. Maloney, was later convicted of accepting bribes.
 Juan Ramos, Florida. Convicted 1983. Acquitted on retrial in April 1987.
 Robert Wallace, Georgia. Convicted 1980.
 Anthony Ray Peek, Florida. Convicted 1978.

1988

 Larry Troy and Willie Brown, Florida. Convicted 1983.

1989

 Randall Dale Adams, Texas. Convicted 1977. He was exonerated as a result of information uncovered by film-maker Errol Morris and presented in an acclaimed 1988 documentary, The Thin Blue Line. Adams was released and all charges were dropped in December 1988.
 James Joseph Richardson, Florida. Convicted 1968.

1990s
1990

 Clarence Brandley, Texas. Convicted 1981.
 Dale Johnston, Ohio. Convicted 1984.

1991

 Gary Nelson, Georgia. Convicted 1980.
 Charles Smith, Indiana. Convicted 1983.

1992

 Jay C. Smith, Pennsylvania. Convicted 1986.

1993

 Walter McMillian, Alabama. Convicted 1988. 
 Gregory Wilhoit, Oklahoma. Convicted 1987. Along with Ron Williamson, Wilhoit later became the subject of John Grisham's 2006 non-fiction book The Innocent Man: Murder and Injustice in a Small Town.
 Kirk Bloodsworth, Maryland. Convicted 1985.
 Muneer Deeb, Texas. Convicted 1985. 
 Larry Hudson, Louisiana. Convicted 1967.
 Federico Macias, Texas. Convicted 1984.
 James Albert Robison, Arizona. Convicted 1977.

1994

 Andrew Golden, Florida. Convicted 1991.

1995

 Robert Charles Cruz, Arizona. Convicted 1981. Cruz disappeared in 1997 and his remains were found in 2007.
 Rolando Cruz and Alejandro Hernandez, Illinois. Convicted 1985.
 Sabrina Butler, Mississippi. Convicted 1990.
 Adolph Munson, Oklahoma. Convicted 1985.

1996

 Verneal Jimerson and Dennis Williams, Illinois. Convicted 1985.
 Gary Gauger, Illinois. Convicted 1993.
 Joseph Burrows, Illinois. Convicted 1989.
 David Grannis, Arizona. Convicted 1991.
 Troy Lee Jones, California. Convicted 1982.
 Carl Lawson, Illinois. Convicted 1990.
 Roberto Miranda, Nevada. Convicted 1982.

1997

 Ricardo Aldape Guerra, Texas. Convicted 1982.
 Benjamin Harris, Washington. Convicted 1984.
 Christopher McCrimmon, Arizona. Convicted 1993.
 Larry Randal Padgett, Alabama. Convicted 1992.
 Timothy James McVeigh, Oklahoma. Convicted 1996.
1998

 Curtis Kyles, Louisiana. Convicted 1984.

1999

 Shareef Cousin, Louisiana. Convicted 1996.
 Anthony Porter, Illinois. Convicted 1983.
 Ron Williamson, Oklahoma. Convicted 1988. Along with Gregory R. Wilhoit, Williamson later became the inspiration for and subject of John Grisham's 2006 non-fiction book The Innocent Man: Murder and Injustice in a Small Town.
 Ronald Jones, Illinois. Convicted 1989. Released May 17, 1999.
 Clarence Richard Dexter, Jr., Missouri. Convicted 1991.
 Alfred Rivera, North Carolina. Convicted 1997.
 Steven Smith, Illinois. Convicted 1986.

2000s

2000

 Earl Washington, Jr., Virginia. Convicted 1984.
 Frank Lee Smith, Florida. Convicted 1985. Smith died in prison in January 2000, before being exonerated later that year.
 Eric Clemmons, Missouri. Convicted 1987.
 Hubert Geralds, Jr., Illinois. Convicted 1997.
 Michael Graham, Louisiana. Convicted 1987.
 Joseph Green, Florida. Convicted 1993.
 Oscar Morris, California. Convicted 1983.
 William Nieves, Pennsylvania. Convicted 1994.

2001

 Charles Irvin Fain, Idaho. Convicted 1983.
 Albert Burrell, Louisiana. Convicted 1987.
 Gary Drinkard, Alabama. Convicted 1995.
 Louis Greco, Massachusetts. Convicted 1968. Posthumous exoneration.
 Peter Limone, Massachusetts. Convicted 1968.
 Joaquin Jose Martinez, Florida. Convicted 1997.
 Donald Paradis, Idaho. Convicted 1981.
 Henry Tameleo, Massachusetts. Convicted 1968. Posthumous exoneration.

2002

 Juan Roberto Melendez-Colon, Florida. Convicted 1984.
 Ray Krone, Arizona. Convicted 1992.
 Thomas Kimbell, Pennsylvania. Convicted 1998.
 Andre Minnitt, Arizona. Convicted 1993.
 Larry Osborne, Kentucky. Convicted 1999.

2003

 Nicholas Yarris, Pennsylvania. Convicted 1982.
 John Thompson, Louisiana. Convicted 1985.
 Joseph Amrine, Missouri. Convicted 1986.
 Madison Hobley, Illinois. Convicted 1990.
 Rudolph Holton, Florida. Convicted 1986.
 Stanley Howard, Illinois. Convicted 1987.
 Timothy Howard, Ohio. Convicted 1977.
 Gary Lamar James, Ohio. Convicted 1977.
 Leroy Orange, Illinois. Convicted 1985.
 Aaron Patterson, Illinois. Convicted 1989.
 Lemuel Prion, Arizona. Convicted 1999.
 Wesley Quick, Alabama. Convicted 1997.

2004

 Alan Gell, North Carolina. Convicted 1995.
 Ernest Willis, Texas. Convicted 1987.
 Ryan Matthews, Louisiana. Convicted 1999.
 Laurence Adams, Massachusetts. Convicted 1974.
 Dan L. Bright, Louisiana. Convicted 1996.
 Patrick Croy, California. Convicted 1979.
 Gordon Steidl, Illinois. Convicted 1987.

2005

 Derrick Jamison, Ohio. Convicted 1985.
 Harold C. Wilson, Pennsylvania. Convicted 1989.

2007

 Curtis McCarty, Oklahoma. Convicted 1986.
 Jonathon Hoffman, North Carolina. Convicted 1996.
 Michael Lee McCormick, Tennessee. Convicted 1987.

2008

 Kennedy Brewer, Mississippi. Convicted 1995.
 Glen Edward Chapman, North Carolina. Convicted 1995.
 Levon "Bo" Jones, North Carolina. Convicted 1993.
 Michael Blair, Texas. Convicted 1994.

2009

 Nathson Fields, Illinois. Convicted 1986.
 Paul House, Tennessee. Convicted 1986.
 Daniel Wade Moore, Alabama. Convicted 2002.
 Ronald Kitchen, Illinois. Convicted 1988.
 Michael Toney, Texas. Convicted 1999. Toney later died in a car accident on October 3, 2009, just one month and a day after his exoneration.
 Yancy Douglas, Oklahoma. Convicted 1995.
 Paris Powell, Oklahoma. Convicted 1997.
 Robert Springsteen, Texas. Convicted 2001.

2010s

2010

 Anthony Charles Graves, Texas. Convicted 1994.

2011

 Gussie Vann, Tennessee. Convicted 1984.

2012

 Damon Thibodeaux, Louisiana. Convicted 1997.
 Michael Keenan, Ohio. Convicted 1988.
 Seth Penalver, Florida. Convicted 1994.
 Joe D'Ambrosio, Ohio. Convicted 1989.
 Dale Johnston, Ohio. Convicted 1984.

2013

 Reginald Griffin, Missouri.  Convicted 1983.

2014

 Glenn Ford, Louisiana. Convicted 1984.
 Carl Dausch, Florida.  Convicted 2011.
 Henry Lee McCollum and Leon Brown, North Carolina. Convicted 1984.
 Ricky Jackson, Ronnie Bridgeman, and Wiley Bridgeman, Ohio. Convicted 1975.
 George Stinney Jr., South Carolina. Convicted 1944. Posthumous exoneration.

2015

 Debra Milke, Arizona.  Convicted 1990.
 Anthony Ray Hinton, Alabama.  Convicted 1985.
 Willie Manning, Mississippi. Convicted 1996.
 Alfred Brown, Texas. Convicted 2005.
 Lawrence William Lee, Georgia. Convicted 1987.
 Derral Wayne Hodgkins, Florida. Convicted 2013.
 William Antunes, Massachusetts. Convicted 1990.

2017

 Isaiah McCoy, Delaware. Convicted 2010.
 Rodricus Crawford, Louisiana.  Convicted 2013.
 Ralph Wright, Florida.  Convicted 2014.
 Rickey Newman, Arkansas.  Convicted 2002.
 Gabriel Solache, Illinois.  Convicted 2000.
 Robert Miller, Oklahoma. Convicted 1988.

2018

 Vicente Benavides, California.  Convicted 1993.
 Clemente Aguirre-Jarquin, Florida.  Convicted 2006.

2019

 Paul Browning, Nevada. Convicted 1986.
 Clifford Williams, Florida. Convicted 1976.
 Charles Finch, North Carolina. Convicted 1976.
 Christopher Williams, Pennsylvania. Convicted 1993.

2020s

2020

 Robert Duboise, Florida. Convicted 1985.
 Curtis Flowers, Mississippi. Convicted 1997.
 Kareem Johnson, Pennsylvania. Convicted 2007.
 Roderick Johnson, Pennsylvania. Convicted 1997.
 Walter Ogrod, Pennsylvania. Convicted 1996.

2021

 Sherwood Brown, Mississippi. Convicted 1995.
 Eddie Lee Howard, Jr., Mississippi. Convicted 1994.
 Barry Williams, California. Convicted 1986.

Canada
 Steven Truscott was convicted of a schoolmate's murder in 1959 and sentenced at age 14 to death by hanging. His sentence was commuted to life in prison four months later, and he was paroled in 1969. His conviction was overturned in 2007 for "miscarriage of justice."

See also
 Wrongful execution
 Death row
 Miscarriage of justice
 List of death row inmates in the United States
 List of women on death row in the United States
 Thomas Haynesworth
 List of wrongful convictions in the United States

References

External links
 "Know the Cases: Browse the Profiles". Innocence Project.
 Bluhm Legal Clinic: Center on Wrongful Convictions. Northwestern University School of Law.
 Sherrer, Hans. "Landmark Study Shows the Unreliability of Capital Trial Verdicts". The Independent Review. Justice: Denied.
 The Innocents Database
 Feldman, Meg (February 7, 2008). "Life After DNA Exoneration". Dallas Observer News.

Crime-related lists
Lists of prisoners and detainees